Shane M. Golobic (born August 15, 1991) is an American professional dirt track racing driver. He competes in the World of Outlaws Sprint Car Series and United States Auto Club (USAC) National Midget Series for Matt Wood Racing. Prior to racing nationally, much of his dirt racing participation came in his home state of California, which included winning track championships and the California Sprint Car Civil War Series in 2014.

He also has experience in stock car racing, competing in the NASCAR K&N Pro Series West and NASCAR Cup Series.

Racing career

Dirt track racing
At the age of five, Golobic began Quarter Midget racing at tracks in his native California and driving a car built by his grandfather. When he turned 15, he moved into sprint car racing. While he continued racing in California, he expanded to include events in Indiana as a 16-year-old and won his first race in the state at Lawrenceburg Speedway.

In 2009, he won the Calistoga Speedway 360 Winged Sprints championship by finishing in the top ten in every race. Additional track titles came at Ocean Speedway in 2012 and 2014, while the latter year also saw him win the California Civil War Series championship. In 2016 and 2017, Golobic won the Trophy Cup, a three-day charity race at Thunderbowl Raceway that has the largest sports-related prize money reward in the San Joaquin Valley. At Huset's Speedway in 2020, Golobic won the Midwest Sprint Touring Series 360 Winged Sprint feature over 45 competitors.

He won his first World of Outlaws Sprint Car Series race at Antioch Speedway in 2013. A second victory came at Placerville Speedway in 2019.

In 2017, Golobic ran his first full season in the USAC National Midget Series for Clauson-Marshall Racing and Matt Wood Racing. He won the Indiana Midget Week championship and finished second in the USAC national standings. The following year, he entered the King of the West series with Tarlton Motorsports.

Golobic began competing in the Chili Bowl Nationals in 2008, where he reached the B-Main. He qualified for his first feature A-Main in the 2010 Nationals; additional A-Main runs came in 2011, 2013, and 2016 to 2020. His best A-Main finish during the 2010s was seventh in 2013.

Stock car racing
During the 2013 racing season, Golobic entered the NASCAR K&N Pro Series West and declared for NASCAR Rookie of the Year honors, though he failed to qualify in his first attempt at Stockton 99 Speedway for Valerie Inglebright. In October, he joined Bill McAnally Racing for a three-race schedule beginning at All American Speedway.

In 2021, Golobic joined Live Fast Motorsports for his NASCAR Cup Series debut in Bristol Motor Speedway's Food City Dirt Race. The effort was supported by Matt Wood Racing. After starting 35th, he finished 37th as the result of a lap 41 crash that saw him hit the spinning car of Aric Almirola.

Personal life
Golobic is a third-generation driver as his father and grandfather competed on dirt tracks throughout California like San Jose Speedway before becoming chassis builders. Father John Golobic finished second in the 1996 California Sprint Car Civil War Series standings. Shane's younger brother, Dustin, often serves as his crew chief on his sprint car. He has a bachelor's degree in mechanical engineering from San Jose State University.

A native of Fremont, California, he is nicknamed the "Fremont Flyer". He also has the nickname "Sugar".

Motorsports career results

NASCAR
(key) (Bold – Pole position awarded by qualifying time. Italics – Pole position earned by points standings or practice time. * – Most laps led.)

Cup Series

K&N Pro Series West

 Season still in progress
 Ineligible for series points

References

External links
 
 

Living people
1991 births
NASCAR drivers
People from Fremont, California
San Jose State University alumni
World of Outlaws drivers
Racing drivers from California